Just the Way It Had to Be is a live album by American jazz vibraphonist Milt Jackson featuring performances recorded at Shelly's Manne-Hole in 1969 for the Impulse! label.

Reception
The Allmusic review by Scott Yanow awarded the album 3 stars stating "the music is quite likable, melodic and swinging (particularly for 1969)".

Track listing
All compositions by Milt Jackson except as indicated
 "Listen, Here" (Eddie Harris) – 8:30 
 "S.K.J." – 5:36  
 "Who Can I Turn To (When Nobody Needs Me)" (Leslie Bricusse, Anthony Newley) – 6:53  
 "If I Were a Bell" (Frank Loesser) – 6:01  
 "The Very Thought of You" (Ray Noble) – 8:02  
 "Bags' Groove" – 6:50 
Recorded at Shelly's Manne-Hole in Hollywood, California on August 1 & 2, 1969

Personnel
Milt Jackson – vibes
Teddy Edwards – tenor saxophone   
Monty Alexander – piano
Ray Brown – bass
Dick Berk – drums

References 

Impulse! Records live albums
Milt Jackson albums
1970 live albums
Albums recorded at Shelly's Manne-Hole